Cybertown (CT) (formerly Colony City) was a free (changed to pay per year in 2002), family friendly, online community. There were places (chat rooms) available either through a 2D or 3D chat environment. Users were able to have jobs within the community, earning virtual money called CC's (CityCash) that could be used to buy 3D homes and items. Each user was allowed a free 2D home and could locate it within any of a number of colonies subdivided into neighborhoods and blocks. The cost was $5.00 per month or $49.99 a year.

As of September 2011 the site's membership base declined.  As of February, 2012, the domain for Cybertown and its parent company, IVN, was offline.

New web site was launched by the fans of cybertown on cybertownrevival.com

The history of this site has been discussed in detail by Nadeshda Kaneva as an illustration of the social dynamics that emerge in online communities

Engine
The Cybertown trademark image are the 3D worlds that it has. The 3D worlds run VRML (Virtual Reality Modeling Language), which is easy to design and modify. It uses The Blaxxun Community Platform coupled with the Blaxxun Contact VRML Viewer control, to interact in 3D worlds to make it more complete and capable of having a society structure by adding social interaction between users. Citizens are allowed and encouraged to create 3D objects for use in Cybertown. All its 3D objects were created by its citizens.

History
Colony City was started in 1996 as a showcase project of Blaxxun interactive of Munich, Germany. Colony City made use of the VRML (Virtual Reality Modeling Language), a standard for displaying 3D content, including virtual worlds and avatars, on the Web. These VRML files became shared virtual worlds using Blaxxun's award-winning multi-user server technology, enabling people from all over the world to meet and interact in rich-media environments in real-time on the Web.

Colony City society elements
 Jobs
 Currency
 Home Ownership
 Purchasable Items
 Security
 Rank Hierarchy

Before the merge of ColonyCity and Cybertown, ColonyCity had a massive unemployment problem which neared 90% of users unemployed, making the main purpose people came to ColonyCity was to interact with the other users. Those that were employed were most likely part of the development team or were the first people to arrive.

Midway through 1999, ColonyCity merged with Cybertown which dramatically increased the users to a few thousand. At the time Cybertown was mainly a portal site with categories of links, however ColonyCity was able to use the ideas from the categories to make 3D worlds and expand Cybertown. To allow this influx of citizens to have homes in Cybertown, new "colonies" (places to live) had to be created. This created a huge demand for jobs which in turn created a more dynamic economy and gave new objectives for people.

After the merge Cybertown expanded at a fast rate in terms of new worlds being opened and new users joining on. At this point Cybertown had a little for everyone. There were those who were just passing by, those that didn't want to do anything else but chat, and those who wanted the responsibility of volunteering and holding a job positions with numerous places for advancement. The expansion has since died down and no new 3D worlds have been created.

In 2002 Blaxxun interactive sold Cybertown to Integrated Virtual Networks who charge users a fee for membership.  From direct observation, IVN's interests seemed primarily aimed at development of Silhouette technology, a video / VRML interface, when they took the reins. Cybertown members were offered a first chance to participate in Silhouette—a BETA version which did not become popular because a fee was required to use the interface—but it was never meant to be a technology solely for Cybertown use. Many have said the development of Silhouette was to be the next stage in Cybertown's development. But in this they have confused the promised NEXUS version of Cybertown, a program developed by Cybertown technicians but never completed, with IVN's Silhouette technology.

Failed promises to improve on the technologies behind Cybertown made within the community in fact, along with the fee introduced when IVN came into the picture, seemed to hit the community hard. Inevitably, this led to some public arguments as well as finger pointing. A few individuals tried to take the issues to the citywide Message Boards. Though this never became widespread and was dealt with swiftly by Security, the community nonetheless began to decline. As of 2010, the average number of users online hovered around 30 when numbers over 500 online at any given time were not uncommon in the early days. Special events, like Bingo and public auctions, improve these stats, but only on the days these events are held.

As of February 2012, the Cybertown website has become unavailable. IVN's site also went down but is now back up for public view.

Economics
Citizens are able to hold jobs within the city, earning a daily wage in CityCash (CC's). Citizens can use CC's to purchase upgraded 3D homes and 3D objects. Citizens can also create their own 3D objects via VRML and sell them in the city's Mall for profit. This has created a plethora of diverse and rare items that can be sold secondhand either out of a citizen's backpack (inventory), in the Flea Market, or in the Black Market.

Places in Cybertown
 The Plaza The Plaza is the first place a user is taken once logging in. It links to other places, and thus is akin to a real city plaza.
 ePlex The ePlex is an entertainment center. It features games such as bowling and video poker, an art gallery, streaming video and music, and even a dance club named The Black Sun.
 The Clubs The Clubs are clubs created by Cybertown users based upon interests. Persons with a specific amount of EXP can create a club, anyone can join one.
 The Flea Market The Flea Market is a central place for people to sell items that they own.
 The Black Market The Black Market is akin to the Flea Market, except visitors are not allowed to view the chat. the black market was a linked to area of the cyberhood colony.
 The Mall The Mall is where members can purchase items for placing in homes or giving as gifts or prizes.  All items available for purchase were created by members.
 Le Café Le Café is a fun place to hang out, get a drink, and chat with friends.
 The Bank the bank was a location to send money to other players, and other CC related functions.
 The Library The Library is a multilevel building designed for peaceful reading.  In 2D there are links to many online book sites.
 The Suburbs The Suburbs are 3D worlds created by members of Cybertown.
 Outlands The Outlands was a 3D battle arena where members used teleporting blasters. Back in the early days of CT there was an event called "morph games" where two factions the Loyalist and Rebels fought in official scored battles for the control of colonies. In the original morph games, the Morph/Rebels faction won the "battles", and gained control over the cyberhood colony. subsequent games such as aftermath were won by the rebel factions, before ultimately closing out due to tampering by Game master Talonn, to fix the results of the games.
 The Pool the pool was another hang out area similar to le cafe and the eplex
 Sunset Beach sunset beach was a beach hangout spot similar to le cafe, the eplex, and other themed areas
 The Fun Park the fun park was an amusement park themed hangout area similar to le cafe, the eplex, and sunset beach.
 The Water Park the water park was a water park themed hangout area similar to le cafe, etc.
 The Theme Park the theme park was a theme park hang out area similar to le cafe, etc.
 Flyby Park a reused version of the neoworld battlegrounds from the original morph2 games, flyby park was named after mayor Flyby, who died and subsequently had the park named after him as a memorial.
 The clubs residents could start a club, using the premade club buildings.
 NeoWorld site of the original "battleground" from the first morph games which involved a treasure hunt in order to "win control" of the cyberhood colony.

Technology
Cybertown's various places exist as chat rooms. Users have the option of chatting in either 2D or 3D mode. The 2D chat is a Java applet, and the 3D chat runs off of the Blaxxun plugin. Cybertown has not been updated in several years, the technology is outdated.  Other virtual experience sites have surpassed Cybertown, such as Second Life, There.com, and now with the introduction of two new players which are Vivaty and Google's Lively. Google started Lively in July 2008 and used it as a 3D experiment, the experiment was completed in December 2008 and Lively was cancelled.

References

External links 
 Cybertown Revival

Internet forums
Virtual world communities